Doreen may refer to:

Doreen (given name), a feminine given name in English-speaking countries; any of several people or fictional characters

Songs
 "Doreen", on the 1981 Frank Zappa album You Are What You Is
 "Doreen", on the 1993 Half Man Half Biscuit album This Leaden Pall
 "Doreen", on the 2010 Ace of Base album The Golden Ratio
 "Doreen", on the 2015 Turnpike Troubadours album The Turnpike Troubadours

Other uses
Doreen, a cultivar of scuppernong, which is a variety of Vitis rotundifolia, a species of grape
Doreen, Victoria, a suburb of Melbourne, Australia
Doreen: The Story of a Singer, 1894 novel by Edna Lyall
Hurricane Doreen, any of several named storms

See also
 Dorreen station, a railway station on the Canadian National Railway main line